Hamadan University of Medical Sciences and Health Services (UMSHA) is a medical school  in Iran. Located in the city of Hamadan. Hamadan University of Medical Sciences was founded in March 1972 as a joint program between Iran and France under the name of the Bouali Sina University.

In 1986, the present university was established under the supervision of the ministry of Health. In 1993, Health and Treatment Organization joined to the Medical University and covered all Health, treatment, education, research, development and human resource affairs under a same authority and make this university the main provider of health services in the province.

Hamadan University of Medical Sciences is among "top 10 medical universities of Iran" offering  more than 70 degree programs and 21 non-degree training programs. In 2013, UMSHA was introduced as a type A (highest quality of education and research) Medical university in Iran.
According to the report extracted from the Basic Indicators of Science (ESI) database, at the end of 2018, Hamadan University of Medical Sciences was among the top one percent of universities and research institutes in the world. University is one of the quick growing universities in the world.

UMSHA has 8 faculties, operates 16 hospitals plus rural and urban health care centers.  Hamadan University of Medical Sciences currently has 6339 students in more than seventy undergraduate and graduate programs, including Associate degrees, Bachelor of Sciences, Masters, PhD and the Specialties programs.  There are 445 academic members. This university is established in an educational area of 44241 square meters with a  standard campus in the beautiful hillside of Alvand Mountain and the honored city of Avicenna.

University Deans

More information Chairman's name, date of appointment ...
Name of the Chairman Date of appointment

Dr. Mohammad Ebrahim Shadmani 1976

Dr. Houshang Tarzi 1978

Dr. Mahmoud Tehrani 1986

Dr. Abbas Moeini 1986

Dr. Soleimani Asl 1/10/66

Dr. Ahmad Ameri 14/9/68

Dr. Farid Abolhassani Shahreza 4/5/73

Dr. Seyed Hamid Hashemi 16/4/77

Dr. Abbas Zamanian 9/12/79

Dr. Aref Salehi 8/20/81

Dr. Abdullah Farhadi Nasab 2/12/84

Dr. Reza Safi Arian 7/19/88

Dr. Habibaullah Mousavi Spring 2/29/92

Dr. Rashid Heidari Moghadam 12/2/98

Dr. Mohammadmahdi majzoubi 2021

References

External links
 SCIENTIFIC JOURNAL OF HAMADAN UNIVERSITY OF MEDICAL SCIENCES AND HEALTH SERVICES
 Directory of Medical Schools in Iran
 Journal of Research in Health Sciences

Medical schools in Iran
Educational institutions established in 1975
Universities in Iran